Holy Trinity is a fresco in San Severo chapel in San Severo church in Perugia, executed by Raphael and Perugino.

A commission from bishop Troilo Baglioni, the upper register was painted around 1505 by Raphael, showing the Holy Trinity surrounded by saints and angels. Vasari writes in Lives of the Artists:

He had not painted the lower register by the time he left for Rome and so this was added by Raphael's master Perugino in the 1520s. He added saint Scholastica, her brother Benedict of Nursia and John the Apostle to the left of the niche and Gregory the Great, Boniface and Martha to its right.

It is now in a poor state of conservation due to humidity, lack of conservation and damage from previous restorations by Giovanni Battista Cavalcaselle, Carattoli (1835) and Consoni (1871). At the bottom left of the altar is the inscription "RAPHAEL DE VRBINO D. OCTAVI/ANO STEPHANI VOLTERRANO PRIO/RE SANCTAM TRINITATEM ANGE/LOS ASTANTES SANCTOSQVE / PINXIT / A.D. MDV" and at its bottom left is a record of the work's completion in 1521.

References

1505 paintings
1521 paintings
Paintings by Pietro Perugino
Paintings by Raphael
Church frescos in Italy